Lawrence Rodney Olsonoski (September 10, 1925 – March 6, 1991) was a former guard in the National Football League. After a college career at Minnesota, he was drafted by the Green Bay Packers in the sixth round of the 1948 NFL Draft and played that season with the team. The next season, he would split between the Packers and the New York Bulldogs.

References

1925 births
1991 deaths
People from Kittson County, Minnesota
American football offensive guards
Minnesota Golden Gophers football players
Green Bay Packers players
New York Bulldogs players